Wrightia viridiflora is a species of plant in the family Apocynaceae. It is endemic to Thailand.

References

viridiflora
Endemic flora of Thailand
Trees of Thailand
Vulnerable plants
Taxonomy articles created by Polbot